Frank Ford is the name of:
Frank Ford (Australian politician) (born 1936), Australian politician
Frank Ford (theatre personality), (1935–2018) Australian writer and director
Frank Ford (broadcaster) (1916–2009), Philadelphia radio host
Frankie Ford (1939–2015), U.S. singer
Frank Ford (footballer) (1907–1974), Australian rules footballer
Frank Ford (priest) (1902–1976), Archdeacon of the East Riding from 1957 to 1970
Frank C. Ford (1873–1965), Canadian lawyer

See also 
Francis Ford (disambiguation)
Frank Deford (1938–2017), American sportswriter and novelist
Frank Forde (1890–1983), prime minister of Australia